Hypopachus ustus, the two-spaded narrow-mouthed toad, is a species of frog in the family Microhylidae found in El Salvador, Guatemala, and Mexico.  Its natural habitats are tropical dry and moist lowland forests. Breeding takes place in both temporary and permanent ponds. As this species is widespread and can live modified habitats, it is not considered threatened.

References

ustus
Frogs of North America
Amphibians of Guatemala
Amphibians of Mexico
Amphibians of El Salvador
Taxa named by Edward Drinker Cope
Amphibians described in 1866
Taxonomy articles created by Polbot